SEAY (pronounced "say", born Melissa Seay Harshaw) is an American award-winning New-age music artist and humanitarian who has gained prominence as both a vocalist and composer. 
She has released multiple recordings, many of which have received awards and nominations.
Her 2016 release In the Garden featuring collaborations with Grammy Award winners Ricky Kej and Wouter Kellerman charted on the Billboard New Age albums chart for five weeks peaking at #3 and won the Zone Music Reporter best vocal album of the year.

Her 2018 album A Winter Blessing the Gift was engineered by Jeff Silverman (producer)  and Grammy Award winners Brian Vibberts, Ricky Kej, and P. A. Deepak. From that album for Christmas 2019, two singles, Father Christmas Eyes and On This Starry Night were also released.

During 2021 Seay vocalised on the Wouter Kellerman and David Arkenstone album 'Pageaea', which has been nominated for Best New Age album at the 2022 Grammy Awards.
In 2022 she won an InterContinental Music Award with Best of Pangaea “Beautiful Earth” – New Age.

Formative years
With classical music training in both voice and music, Seay's formative years were spent playing piano, studying voice and traveling with her family throughout the Far East while her father, an Army physician, finished his medical residency. Her great aunt was the celebrated American operatic mezzo-soprano Margaret Harshaw, who performed for 22 seasons with the Metropolitan Opera. She later attended the Sotheby's Institute of Art in London with graduate studies in Decorative Art. It was while living in England and returning to her family's English roots, her music journey began singing on projects for song publishers Carlin, Motown, Warner Chappell Music, artists Elaine Paige and Annie Lennox and performing in London's music scene.

Discography

Albums
2018 A Winter Blessing the Gift
2016 In the Garden 
2007 A Winter Blessing: Songs for the Season 
2006	1 Voice [Special Edition]
2005	1 Voice

Extended play
2015  Love is the Ocean

Singles
2021 Dream (immersive single ep and video) 
2019   "A Winter Blessing The Gift - The Singles"
2018   "On This Starry Night" 
2011   "I Will Love You Still"
2009	"A Christmas Heart"
2009   "All Around The World"

Compilation album
2022 The 64th FYC album (Various Atrists) and review of Seay's 'Dream' 
2019/2020 A Better Life, Mindful Music Association.
2018 Let's Have a Rockin' Christmas, Vol 3 - Various Artists.

All Music:
CD Baby:

Collaborations
2021 Pangaea 
2019 Song from M.A.S.H 
2017 Sounds from the Circle IX
2009 Sounds from the Circle 1
2018 Through The Vortex: The Sedona Effect - Bruce Lev
2017 Particles in Space - Armand Hutton, Brian Scanlon Maksim Velichkin & Laura Halladay
2015 Shanti Samsara Ricky Kej CD 
CD1  Shanti Amitabh Bachchan Frances Fisher Rosanna Arquette Lindsay Wagner
CD1 Kudrat - Hariharan Raveolution String Section 
CD2 Love Divine - Patti Austin Wouter Kellerman
2015 Proyog: From yoga's birthplace -Ricky Kej
2013 Breath of Heaven - Stephen Peppos

Filmography
2007 Gracie: The Diary of a Coma Patient

Awards and nominations
 2022 - InterContinental Music Award, Winner, Best of Pangaea “Beautiful Earth” – New Age.
 2022 - SAMA South Africa, 'Pangaea' by Wouter Kellerman & David Arkenstone, nominated for best duo or group, best classical/contemporary instrumental, which features SEAY on vocals.
2022 - COVR Visionary Awards - Silver medal for 'Oceanusa' and Bronze medal for 'Beautiful Earth'
2022 - Grammy Awards Pangaea Wouter Kellerman and David Arkenstone  album (as vocalist) 
 2021 - Covr Award finalists - 1 Voice (album) and This Starry Night (music video).
 2020 - Textura.org - New Age Number 1 A Better Life, compilation album featuring Heaven's Gate by Seay.
 2020 - Peace Song Awards, 3 category nominations, including winning the Social Media Reach award with Heaven's Gate
 2020 - Hollywood Music in Media Awards Nominee New-age music/Ambient music  Heaven's Gate  
 2020 -  COVR Visionary Award Winner In the Garden album 
 2019 - Hollywood Music in Media Awards Nominee-Best Holiday song -"Father Christmas eyes" 
2019 - Global Music Awards -Silver Medal - Winter Blessing the Gift, album and female vocalist 
2019 - Global Music Awards- Top albums 
2019 - Clouzine International Music Awards 
2018 - Mainly Piano - Michael Debbage top 5 - Winter Blessing the Gift 
2017 - Zone Music Reporter- Vocal Album of The Year winner - Top 100 Radio Awards -  Seay In the Garden 
2017 - Global Peace Song Awards winner new age song - "We Are One"  
2017 - Global Peace Song Awards winner social media - "We Are One" 
2017 - Global Music Awards- Silver Medal "We Are One" new age pop and female vocalist 
2017 - Hollywood Music in Media Awards Nominee - Seay and Geoff Koch - Hearts afire 
2016 - Billboard Chart #3 Peak - New Age Albums - In the Garden 
2016 - Zone Music Reporter Best Vocal Album - In the Garden 
2016 - Global Music Awards- Silver Medal  New Age Album - Seay In the Garden 
2016 - Hollywood Music in Media Awards Nominee "We Are One" Best Ambient New Age Song 
2016 - Mainly Piano - Michael Debbage top 2 - In the Garden 
2011- Park City Film Music Festival - Gracie: The Diary of a Coma Patient (Film)  - Musical Excellence in a Performance/Experimental Film

Humanitarian events
Seay has been a part of humanitarian events which include the opening ceremonies of International Day of Peace and her song "All Around The World"  was a featured theme for Project Peace on Earth's Love All Simulcast live from Bethlehem, Palestine on Christmas Day 2012, for which she is a musical ambassador, her vocal chant piece  "Orion's Gate" is also on Project Peace on Earth's 2 Unite All Volumes 1 and 2 with 26 world artists including Peter Gabriel, Roger Waters, and Stewart Copeland, in support of The United Nations World Peace Initiatives.
Vocal work includes participation on the world music project "Shanti Samsara" launching the 2015 United Nations Climate Change Conference in Paris produced by Ricky Kej.
She is also a C.A.R.E channel artist, providing original instrumental music as a therapeutic tool for use in acute care hospitals, residential care facilities, hospices, palliative care units, cancer centers, children's hospitals, and rehabilitation.

References

Living people
Musicians from Charlottesville, Virginia
21st-century American composers
21st-century American women pianists
21st-century American women singers
21st-century American singers
21st-century American pianists
American new-age musicians
New-age composers
New-age pianists
21st-century women composers
Year of birth missing (living people)